Karn or KARN may refer to:

People
 Avinash Karn (born 1995), Nepalese cricketer
 Esther Nelson Karn (1860–1936), American poet
 Mick Karn (1958–2011), Cypriot-British musician
 Phil Karn (born 1956), American engineer
 Phil Karn (soccer) (born 1975), American soccer player
 Richard Karn (born 1956), American actor, author and game show host

Radio stations
 KARN (AM), a radio station in Little Rock, Arkansas, U.S.
 KARN-FM, a radio station in Little Rock, Arkansas, U.S.

Other uses
 Karn (comics), a Marvel Comics character
 Sisterhood of Karn, fictional religious cult in Doctor Who

See also

 Karna (disambiguation)
 Karna, a character in the Hindu epic Mahābhārata
 Karn's algorithm, for estimating round-trip times for TCP messages in computer networking